Dithecodendridae is an extinct family of graptolites.

Genera
List of genera from Maletz (2014):

†Archaeolafoea Chapman, 1919
†Bulmanidendrum Obut, 1974
? †Dalyia Walcott, 1919
†Dithecodendrum Obut, 1964
†Karasidendrum Sennikov, 1998
†Ovetograptus Sdzuy, 1974
†Protodendrum Sennikov, 1998
†Siberiodendrum Obut, 1964
†Sibiriograptus Obut, 1964
†Sotograptus Sdzuy, 1974
†Tarnagraptus Sdzuy, 1974

References

Graptolites
Prehistoric hemichordate families